V923 Aquilae is a variable binary star system in the equatorial constellation of Aquila. It has the designation HD 183656 from the Henry Draper Catalogue; V932 Aql is the variable star designation. The system is dimly visible to the naked eye with an apparent visual magnitude that fluctuates around 6.06. It is located at a distance of approximately 890 light years from the Sun based on parallax, but is drifting closer with a radial velocity of around −26 km/s.

This system was first identified as a likely spectroscopic binary by W. E. Harper in 1937, who noted it showed "narrow intense lines of peculiar spectrum". P. W. Merrill and C. G. Burwell identified it as a shell star in 1949. Merrill and A. L. Lowen showed in 1953 that the shell displayed large radial velocity variations. A photometric study by C. R. Lynds in 1960 showed the system varied in brightness with an amplitude of more than 0.1 in magnitude and a characteristic period of 0.85 days, although it does not behave periodically over long time intervals.

A more thorough investigation by P. Koubský and associates in 1989 using long-term radial velocity measurements determined this is a spectroscopic binary with an orbital period of 214.75 days. There is also an overlaying long-term cyclical variation of changing amplitude and period. The modelled binary system shows a primary with a class of around B5–7e and a low mass secondary separated by around 250 times the radius of the Sun. They hypothesized that the long-term variation was due to an envelope created by a mass transfer from the secondary component to the primary. However, the mass transfer concept was later brought into question and remains unverified as of 2004.

References

External links
 HR 7415
 Image V923 Aquilae

B-type giants
Be stars
Gamma Cassiopeiae variable stars
Binary stars

Aquila (constellation)
Durchmusterung objects
183656
095929
7415
Aquilae, V923